New Letters, the name it has been published under since 1970, is one of the oldest literary magazines in the United States and continues to publish award-winning poems and fiction. The magazine is based in Kansas City, Missouri.

History and editors
The University Review was founded in 1934 at the University of Kansas City, a small, private school that later became part of the University of Missouri system. In its first two years, the periodical published a discussion on "Art and Social Struggle", including contributions from Thomas Hart Benton and Diego Rivera, a story by Vance Randolph, a poem by Edgar Lee Masters, and a personal note from Pearl S. Buck.

Starting with the Spring 1938 issue, Alexander P. Cappon became editor and remained in that post for the next 33 years. In 1944 the magazine's name was changed to The University of Kansas City Review. In that time the magazine published work by May Sarton, J.D. Salinger, E.E. Cummings, Marianne Moore, May Swenson, James T. Farrell, Kenneth Rexroth.

In 1971, David Ray took over as editor and the magazine's name was changed again, this time to New Letters. Ray published work by Robert Bly, Cyrus Colter, Anselm Hollo, Joyce Carol Oates, Richard Hugo, Robert Peters and Josephine Jacobsen.

In 1986, James McKinley became editor, and under his editorship the magazine published new work by Amiri Baraka, Thomas Berger, former President Jimmy Carter, Annie Dillard, Tess Gallagher, William Gass, Charles Simic, John Updike, and Miller Williams.

Robert Stewart took over the post of editor-in-chief for New Letters, New Letters on the Air, and their affiliate, BkMk Press in September 2002. Since becoming editor, the magazine has published such writers as Brian Doyle, Quincy Troupe, Daniel Woodrell, Sherman Alexie, Sergio Troncoso, Marilyn Hacker, Maxine Kumin and Charlotte Holmes.

New Letters won the National Magazine Award for the essay on May 1, 2008 at Lincoln Center in New York.  The essay "I Am Joe's Prostate" by Thomas E. Kennedy appears in Volume 73, Issue 4.

New Letters on the Air
In 1977, editor David Ray and his wife, Judy, began the audio literature program New Letters on the Air, a half-hour radio program featuring writers reading from their work and talking about it.

Rebekah Presson produced and hosted the show for many years until 1996 when Angela Elam took over. The program is now the longest continuously-running national literary radio series, having broadcast more than 1,200 programs. The show is now heard on radio stations worldwide, and is available to even more listeners as a podcast. It is distributed by PRX.

New Letters Literary Awards
The New Letters Literary Awards program was begun in 1986. It consists of prizes for poetry, essays and short stories:
 New Letters Poetry Prize — $1,500 for the best group of three to six poems 
 Dorothy Churchill Cappon Essay Prize — $1,500 for the best essay
 Alexander Patterson Cappon Fiction Prize — $1,500 for the best short story

See also
List of literary magazines

References

External links
 New Letters website
 New Letters literary awards web page
 the air/ New Letters On the Air website

Poetry magazines published in the United States
Quarterly magazines published in the United States
Magazines established in 1934
University of Missouri–Kansas City
Magazines published in Missouri
1934 establishments in Missouri